The Supercopa Libertadores was a seasonal association football competition that was established in 1988. It was usually contested between August and December. The Supercopa Sudamericana was opened to the past winners of Copa Libertadores; Vasco da Gama, winners of the Copa de Campeones tournament held in 1948, was later allowed to participate. Nearly every phase of the competition was contested over two legs, one at each participating club's stadium. Racing Club won the inaugural competition in 1988, defeating Cruzeiro 4–1 on points. 

Cruzeiro, alongside Independiente, hold the record for the most victories, with two wins each since the competition's inception. They are also the only teams to have won the competition consecutively. Overall, eight different clubs have won the competition since its inception in 1988 until it folded in 1997 to give room for other competitions. Clubs from Argentina have won the most Supercopa Libertadores titles, with six wins among them. Brazilian teams are second with three victories, and Paraguay are third with a lone triumph.

Key

Finals

Performances

By club

Performance by country

See also
List of Copa Libertadores winners

References

 
Supercopa Libertadores